Sandy Lake, also known as Pelican Mountain, is a hamlet in Alberta, Canada within the Municipal District of Opportunity No. 17. It is located on Highway 813, between Calling Lake and Wabasca.

The hamlet is located in Census Division No. 17 as well as the federal riding of Fort McMurray-Athabasca.

Demographics 

See also 
List of communities in Alberta
List of designated places in Alberta
List of hamlets in Alberta

References

External links 

Hamlets in Alberta
Designated places in Alberta
Municipal District of Opportunity No. 17